Greg King may refer to:

Greg King (writer) (born 1961), American journalist and conservationist
Greg King (author) (born 1964), American author
Greg King (lawyer) (1969–2012), New Zealand lawyer
Greg King (rugby union) (born 1988), English rugby union player
Greg King (cricketer) (born 1973), South African cricketer and current fitness coach to the national team
Gregory King (1648–1712), English genealogist, engraver and statistician
Gregory King (sound designer) (born 1966), Canadian sound designer for film and television